Qualification for the 2012 United States Men's Curling Championship took place in two rounds in January at various locations throughout the nation. The number of entrants to the national championships was cut down to eleven teams through a playdown system of regional qualifiers and a challenge round.

Qualification system
As with last year, teams qualified for the men's nationals either by qualifying automatically as one of the top two teams on the World Curling Tour Order of Merit, by qualifying through a regional qualifier, or by qualifying through the challenge round. The two teams that qualified automatically to the championships were chosen based on the Order of Merit upon the conclusion of the Curl Mesabi Cash Spiel. This year, the teams were those skipped by Tyler George and Craig Brown. The other eight spots in the nationals were awarded as follows: five were awarded to the top finishers in the regional qualifiers, and three were awarded to the top finishers in the challenge round.

The qualification rounds were all held with the double knockout provision in place. The double knockout provision states that a team is eliminated from qualifying for the nationals if the team has at least two losses in their win-loss record. If there are teams with less than two losses, they will play each other until the number of teams still able to qualify matches the number of qualification spots available.

Regional qualifiers
The qualifiers were held from January 4 to 8 in Green Bay, Wisconsin, Seattle, Washington, Grand Forks, North Dakota, and Laurel, Maryland, given that at least five teams sign up at each qualifier. If there were less than five teams signed up at any site, the qualifier at that site would have been cancelled, and teams could either be moved to an alternate site or cancel their registration. Qualifiers with more than ten teams would have been held in a knockout format, and qualifiers with less than ten teams would have been held in a round robin format. Each qualifier site was awarded one or more qualification spots to the nationals based on the strength of field at each qualifier site. The strength of field of each team was calculated using Order of Merit points, past participation in national championships and world championships, and final ranks at past national championships. In total, five teams qualified from the four regional qualifiers, and eight teams moved from the qualifiers to the challenge round. This year, the teams that qualified from the regional qualifiers were those skipped by Heath McCormick, Wes Johnson, John Shuster, Owen Sampson, and Blake Morton.

Challenge round
The top eight finishers from the regional qualifiers that did not qualify for the nationals were invited to play in the challenge round, which were held from January 19 to 22 in Eau Claire, Wisconsin. Two other teams that were not qualified to either the nationals or the challenge round were then invited based on their Order of Merit points. If a team qualifying to the challenge round through a regional qualifier declined its invitation, the spot would have been filled based on the Order of Merit. A maximum of ten teams could play at the challenge round. The number of teams invited from each qualifier were determined using the strength of field system. The challenge round was played in a round robin format. At the conclusion of the round robin, the top three teams were chosen to qualify to the nationals. This year, those teams were those skipped by Eric Fenson, Mike Farbelow, and Todd Birr.

Regional qualifiers
All four qualifiers were held at their respective locations from January 4 to 8. A total of 39 teams registered to participate in the regional qualifiers. Of these teams, three teams qualified directly to the nationals without participation in the qualifying rounds. The rink skipped by Pete Fenson did not have to participate in the qualifiers due to their participation on behalf of the United States at the 2012 USA-Brazil Challenge. Two teams, skipped by Tyler George and Craig Brown, qualified directly to the nationals by virtue of their Order of Merit rankings. If Fenson was one of the top two ranked Order of Merit teams, there would only have been one other team qualifying directly to the nationals via Order of Merit, but Fenson was not one of the top two ranked Order of Merit teams, so the top two ranked teams qualified directly to the nationals.

Participating teams
The following is a list of all teams registered to participate in the regional qualifiers. The teams skipped by Pete Fenson, Craig Brown, and Tyler George qualified automatically, and as such did not need to participate in the qualifying rounds.

Laurel qualifier
The Laurel qualifier was held at the Potomac Curling Club in Laurel, Maryland. It was held in a round robin format. At the conclusion of the round robin, the top team qualified directly to the Nationals, and the second-ranked team qualified to the challenge round. The team skipped by Heath McCormick qualified directly to the Nationals, and the team skipped by Derek Surka qualified to the challenge round.

Standings

Final round-robin standings

Standings after tiebreakers

Round-robin results

Draw 1
Thursday, January 5, 2:00 pm

Draw 2
Thursday, January 5, 7:00 pm

Draw 3
Friday, January 6, 9:00 am

Draw 4
Friday, January 6, 2:00 pm

Draw 5
Friday, January 6, 7:00 pm

Draw 6
Saturday, January 7, 9:00 am

Draw 7
Saturday, January 7, 2:00 pm

Draw 8
Saturday, January 7, 7:00 pm

Draw 9
Saturday, January 7, 9:00 am

Tiebreakers

Round 1
Sunday, January 8, 2:00 pm

Round 2
Sunday, January 8, 7:00 pm

Seattle qualifier
The Seattle qualifier was held at the Granite Curling Club in Seattle, Washington. It was held in a round robin format. At the conclusion of the round robin, the top team qualified directly to the Nationals, and the second-ranked team qualified to the challenge round. The team skipped by Wes Johnson qualified directly to the Nationals, while the team skipped by Sean Beighton qualified to the challenge round.

Standings

Final round-robin standings

Standings after tiebreakers

Round-robin results

Draw 1
Thursday, January 5, 7:00 pm

Draw 2
Friday, January 6, 1:00 pm

Draw 3
Friday, January 6, 7:00 pm

Draw 4
Saturday, January 7, 9:00 am

Draw 5
Saturday, January 7, 2:00 pm

Tiebreaker
The "tiebreaker" was played in accordance with the double knockout provision. Wes Johnson and Sean Beighton were the top two teams in the pool, and even though Johnson was undefeated, a deciding game needed to be held between Johnson and Beighton. Beighton had one loss (from losing to Johnson), and Johnson had none. If Beighton had won the tiebreaker, he and Johnson would have had one loss apiece, and would have needed to decide which team would advance to the nationals by playing another tiebreaker, which would have given one team two losses, therefore eliminating that team from the top spot. Johnson won this tiebreaker, so Beighton, with two losses, took second place.

Saturday, January 7, 7:00 pm

Grand Forks qualifier
The Grand Forks qualifier was held at the Grand Forks Curling Club in Grand Forks, North Dakota. It will be held in a triple knockout format. Two teams qualified directly to the Nationals, and four teams qualified to the challenge round. The team skipped by John Shuster qualified directly to the Nationals by winning the A Event, and the team skipped by Owen Sampson qualified directly to the Nationals by winning the B Event. Teams skipped by Eric Fenson, Peter Stolt, Ryan Berg, and Todd Birr qualified to the challenge round.

Knockout brackets

A event
The qualifier in the A event will be qualified to participate in the Nationals.

B event
The qualifier in the B event will be qualified to participate in the Nationals.

C event
All qualifiers in the C event will qualify to participate in the challenge round.

Knockout results

Draw 1
Thursday, January 5, 7:00 pm

Draw 2
Friday, January 6, 9:00 am

Draw 3
Friday, January 6, 2:00 pm

Draw 4
Friday, January 6, 7:00 pm

Draw 5
Saturday, January 7, 9:00 am

Draw 6
Saturday, January 7, 2:00 pm

Draw 7
Saturday, January 7, 7:00 pm

Draw 8
Sunday, January 8, 9:00 am

Draw 9
Sunday, January 8, 2:00 pm

Green Bay qualifier
The Green Bay qualifier was held at the Green Bay Curling Club in Green Bay, Wisconsin. It was held in a round robin format. At the conclusion of the round robin, one team qualified directly to the Nationals, and two teams qualified to the challenge round. The team skipped by Blake Morton qualified directly to the Nationals, while the teams skipped by John Benton and Mike Farbelow qualified to the challenge round.

Standings

Final round-robin standings

Standings after tiebreakers

Round-robin results

Draw 1
Thursday, January 5, 2:00 pm

Draw 2
Thursday, January 5, 7:00 pm

Draw 3
Friday, January 6, 2:00 pm

Draw 4
Friday, January 6, 8:00 pm

Draw 5
Saturday, January 7, 11:00 am

Tiebreakers

Round 1
Saturday, January 7, 4:00 pm

Round 2
Saturday, January 7, 9:00 pm

Challenge round
The challenge round was held from January 19 to 22 at the Eau Claire Curling Club in Eau Claire, Wisconsin. A maximum of ten teams could compete in the challenge round, and three teams advanced to the nationals. A maximum of eight teams from the qualifiers could compete in the challenge round, while a minimum of two teams were chosen based on their Order of Merit. The teams skipped by Eric Fenson, Mike Farbelow, and Todd Birr advanced to the nationals.

Teams
The teams are listed as follows:

Notes
 Beighton declined his berth to the challenge round.

Round-robin standings
Final round-robin standings

Round-robin results

Draw 1
Thursday, January 19, 2:00 pm

Draw 2
Thursday, January 19, 7:00 pm

Draw 3
Friday, January 20, 9:00 am

Draw 4
Friday, January 20, 2:00 pm

Draw 5
Friday, January 20, 7:00 pm

Draw 6
Saturday, January 21, 9:00 am

Draw 7
Saturday, January 21, 2:00 pm

Draw 8
Saturday, January 21, 7:00 pm

Draw 9
Sunday, January 22, 9:00 am

References

2012 in curling
United States National Curling Championships
Qualification for curling competitions